USNS Sirius (T-AFS 8) was a Sirius-class combat stores ship of the United States Navy, named for Sirius , the brightest star visible from Earth other than the Sun.

Sirius was built by Swan Hunter & Wigham Richardson for the Royal Navy. Laid down in 1965, she was launched in 1966 from Wallsend as RFA Lyness with the pennant A339 serving in the British Royal Fleet Auxiliary.

On 15 November 1980, the ship was acquired by charter by the United States Military Sealift Command. She was transferred  to the U.S. Navy's Military Sealift Command in 1981.

Sirius was deactivated and struck from the Naval Vessel Register in 2005 and given to the U.S. Department of Transportation's Maritime Administration (MARAD), then assigned to Texas Maritime Academy under an agreement that it can be activated by MARAD at any time. During the fall of 2005, the Sirius served in New Orleans for Katrina relief, from 10 September until 29 November and at Lake Charles, LA for Rita relief until 2 March. Because of its extended relief effort the Sirius was unable to undergo a refit in 2006 to adapt its new role as a training vessel and comply with U.S. Coast Guard safety standards.  Because the Sirius had not undergone a refit, it could not be formally commissioned as the USTS Texas Clipper III nor could it be used for summer training cruises.  In the winter of 2009 the US Coast Guard ruled that the Sirius was unfit for training and was prepared for decommissioning while the school looked for a new training ship. On 25 June 2009, the Sirius was returned to the U.S. Maritime Administration.

Sirius was scrapped at Brownsville on 30 May 2014.

Honors and awards
The USNS Sirius is authorized the following awards:

References 

 
 
 

 

Ships built on the River Tyne
1966 ships
Sirius-class combat stores ships
Ness-class combat stores ships
Ships built by Swan Hunter